Texas State Highway 144 (SH 144) is a state highway that runs from Meridian to Granbury in central Texas.

Route description
SH 144 begins at an intersection with  SH 22 in Meridian. The route travels northwest to Walnut Springs before turning in a more northerly direction. It enters Glen Rose, where it has a one-mile concurrency with  US 67. After separating from US 67, the highway resumes its northward journey to Granbury, where it intersects the  US 377 bypass. The SH 144 designation ends at an intersection with  Bus. US 377 in central Granbury.

History
SH 144 was designated on March 17, 1930 from Glen Rose to Meridian. The road from Cleburne to Walnut Springs was erroneously omitted from the state highway log, but was designated as SH 144T. On November 30, 1932, SH 144T was officially added to the state highway log. On December 8, 1932, SH 144T was decommissioned as the construction on the section of SH 144 from Walnut Springs to Glen Rose was taken over and construction had started on it. On July 12, 1933, it extended north to Granbury and then northwest via Lipan to Brandon's Bridge. On October 9, 1934, it was rerouted west to northwest of Lipan. On July 15, 1935, everything north of Glen Rose was cancelled. The section from Glen Rose to Granbury was restored on September 22, 1936. An alignment of the route in Glen Rose was previously designated Spur 216 before being combined with SH 144 in September 26, 1949.

Major intersections

Notes

References

144
Transportation in Bosque County, Texas
Transportation in Somervell County, Texas
Transportation in Hood County, Texas